The Orthodox Lutheran Confessional Conference is a group of independent Lutheran congregations. The OLCC was organized in 2006 after the charter congregations left the Lutheran Churches of the Reformation.

Organizational structure 
The OLCC consists of independent Lutheran congregations who are united in doctrine and practice. It has no political structure, treasury, or form of government. The pastoral conference has a chairman who serves as a point of contact for outside groups and congregations.

Doctrine and practice 
The OLCC professes that the Book of Concord is in complete agreement with the teachings of the Bible. In Lutheranism, this is known as a quia subscription.

The following beliefs distinguish this group from others which likewise profess a quia subscription.

Church 
 Only the local congregation is a body of Christians that has the right to establish the ministry in its midst.
 Other organizations which congregations may join have no divine authority whatsoever.
 The spiritual rule of a congregation is given to the Office of the Ministry, whose incumbents serve at the behest of God and the congregation. The spiritual rule is the rule of the Word of God.
 The external governing of a congregation may be carried out in any number of ways, as the circumstances require. Thus church boards, voter's assemblies, general consensus, or pastoral rule are all valid forms of external church government.
 The external government of the church is limited to matters which in themselves are not spiritual, such as the holding and maintenance of property, scheduling of meetings, etc. It must yield to the spiritual rule in all matters where the spiritual and external rule intersect.
 Nevertheless, the external government cannot violate God's own commands as to how the church should be governed. Thus those who rule the church even in its external aspects must still be male, and rule according to love, etc.
 Though a congregation may be organized in any number of forms (corporation, trust, house church, etc.) these forms do not in any way alter the spiritual nature or existence of that congregation. The elimination or conversion of the external form does not eliminate or alter the congregation itself, provided the congregation is still a group of Christians who continue to gather regularly around the Word and sacraments, with the office of the ministry established in their midst.

Ministry 
 The Office of the Ministry, the Office of the Keys, and the Preaching Office are all synonymous.
 This office belongs to the whole church. Emergencies excepted, the church exercises the office by filling it, and also when practicing excommunication.
 The office is filled when the local church issues a call to a qualified man, who then accepts this call. This call is considered to be a mediate divine call, where God works through the local congregation as His instrument.
 Only the local congregation is a church that can issue a divine call. Other organizations cannot, because only the local congregation meets regularly, in a particular place, around the means of Grace (which are defined as the word and the sacraments), all other groups being of a transitory nature.
 Though a local congregation may ask for assistance in choosing a candidate for the ministry, the right to issue a divine call cannot be transferred from the local congregation to another body. It is always the local congregation that calls.
 The essential duties of this office are preaching, teaching, and administering the sacraments.
 Individuals in this office may, by human arrangement, be divided into different branches, such as pastor, assistant pastor, seminary professor, evangelist (missionary), vicar, etc., but each has the full office and can therefore rightly preach, teach, and administer the sacraments.
 No minister can by divine right claim a rank higher than any other minister, all incumbents in the ministry being equals.
 An incumbent in this office may have helpers who assist him in his duties, but those helpers cannot "borrow" his call. Therefore, in the church, emergencies excepted, they may not preach, teach, or administer the sacraments without themselves having a divine call and being installed into the Office of the Ministry.

External links 
 Orthodox Lutheran Confessional Conference

Lutheran denominations in North America